The use of heraldry in Serbia or by Serbs is used by government bodies, subdivisions of the national government, organizations, corporations and by families. Serbian heraldry belongs culturally to the Byzantine tradition.

As in some other European heraldic traditions, the most prominent among the animals is the eagle.

The most prominent symbols is the Serbian eagle and the Serbian cross.

Background

Medieval Serbian legacy
 
The double-headed eagle and the Serbian cross are the main heraldic symbols which represent the national identity of the Serbian people across the centuries.

Illyrian Armorials

Habsburg and Austro-Hungarian heraldry
Serbian nobility in the Habsburg monarchy and Austria-Hungary, upon receiving noble status, adopted coat of arms, often influenced by the Illyrian Armorials.

History

Revolutionary Serbia
  

The war flags of the first and second Serbian uprisings (1804–1815) are in several types.

The seal of the Serbian parliament had the Serbian cross and the Triballi boar.

Serbian monarchy
 

Principality of Serbia

 
Karađorđević dynasty

Kingdom of Yugoslavia

Socialist Yugoslavia

Derived from the traditional shield of arms of Serbia with 4 fire steels (but without the cross). The Serbian cross was removed for ideological reasons of socialist atheism. It was placed above a rising sun with a cog wheel symbolizing the workers and surrounded with a golden wreath of maize and oak leaves, oak being a sacred Serbian tree. A red ribbon with dates 1804 and 1941 which refer to the dates of the first Serbian uprising against the Ottomans and the national uprising against the axis powers in the Second World War.

Contemporary heraldry
Federal Republic of Yugoslavia and later Republic of Serbia.

Coat of arms of Serbia

The modern coat of arms is derived from the Obrenović dynasty coat of arms, which drew influence from the medieval Nemanjić dynasty. The principal field stands for the Serbian state. It consists of a double-headed (bicephalic) eagle on a red shield; its body and wings in silver, and tongues, beaks, legs and claws in gold, between two golden fleurs-de-lys. The inescutcheon stands for the Serbian nation; in a red shield, a cross between four silver firesteels arranged in the quarters around it, all of them facing horizontally outwards.

Although Serbia is now a republic, the new coat of arms also features the crown of the former Serbian monarchy. While unusual for republics, it is not unprecedented, as can be seen with the Republic of San Marino (San Marino adopted a new crown to represent its sovereignty, and did not usurp a crown of a past sovereign).

Coat of arms of municipalities and cities

Ada. A Hajduk.

Niš. The Serbian eagle and the Niš Fortress

Veternik. A World War I Serbian soldier.

Zemun. A deer, tree and lion holding sword.

Prijepolje. The Serbian eagle and Kotromanic crown.

Sremska Mitrovica. Latin inscription: CIVITAS SANCTI DEMETRII

Common symbols

The double-headed eagle and the Serbian cross are the main heraldic symbols which represent the national identity of the Serbian people across the centuries. Both the eagle and cross were adopted from the Byzantine Empire, and are today part of the Coat of arms of Serbia. The double-headed eagle was used by the Nemanjić dynasty.

Another common symbol is the Triballian boar, depicting the head of a boar pierced by an arrow. It was used for historical Serbia in numerous armorials dating between the 15th and 18th centuries. It was adopted by Karađorđe into the seal of the Revolutionary Serbian government, alongside the Serbian cross.

St. George and the Dragon, a symbol of courage and valor and the triumph of Good over Evil, is used in the coat of arms of Srpski Krstur. The severed Turk head, in reference to the wars with the Ottoman Empire, is used on the coat of arms of Kikinda and Vršac.

Popular elements in modern heraldry include the Serbian tricolour, nature, such as oak, olive, wheat, plum, grape; weapons, such as sword, cannon, gun, arrows.

See also

Serbian Heraldry Society
Medieval Serbian coinage

References

Further reading

External links
Society of Serbian Armigers "Milos Obilic"
Serb Heraldic Society "White Eagle"